The 73rd Regiment Indiana Infantry was an infantry regiment that served in the Union Army during the American Civil War.

Service
The 73rd Indiana Infantry was organized and mustered in at Camp Rose, South Bend, Indiana for a three-year enlistment on August 16, 1862, under the command of Colonel Gilbert Hathaway.

The regiment was attached to: 
 20th Brigade, 6th Division, Army of the Ohio, September 1862. 
 20th Brigade, 6th Division, II Corps, Army of the Ohio, to November 1862. 
 3rd Brigade, 1st Division, Left Wing, XIV Corps, Army of the Cumberland, to January 1863. 
 3rd Brigade, 1st Division, XXI Corps, Army of the Cumberland, to April 1863. 
 Streight's Provisional Brigade. Department of the Cumberland, to May 1863. 
 Prisoners of War to December 1863. 
 Post and District of Nashville, Tennessee, Department of the Cumberland, to January 1864. 
 1st Brigade, District of Nashville, Tennessee, Department of the Cumberland, January 1864. 
 1st Brigade, Rousseau's 3rd Division, XII Corps, Army of the Cumberland, to April 1864.
 1st Brigade, 4th Division, XX Corps, Department of the Cumberland, to March 1865. 
 District of Northern Alabama, Department of the Cumberland, to June 1865.

The 73rd Indiana Infantry mustered out of service on July 1, 1865.

Detailed service

 Ordered to Lexington, Kentucky. Evacuation of Lexington August 31. 
 Pursuit of Bragg, to London, Kentucky, October 1–22, 1862. 
 Battle of Perryville, October 8 (reserve). 
 March to Nashville, Tennessee, October 22-November 9, and duty there until December 26. 
 Advance on Murfreesboro, Tennessee, December 26–30. 
 Battle of Stones River December 30–31, 1862 and January 1–3, 1863. 
 Duty at Murfreesboro until April. 
 Reconnaissance to Nolensville and Versailles January 13–15. 
 Streight's Raid to Rome, Georgia, April 26-May 3. End of Streight's Raid was a 3 day running battle across 120 miles of Alabama Wilderness.
  Day's Gap - April 30
  Sand Mountain - April 30
  Crooked Creek - April 30
  Hog Mountain - April 30
  East Branch - May 1 
  Black Warrior Creek - May 1
  Blount's Farm - May 2
  Centre - May 2 
  Cedar Bluff - May 3 
      *Regiment captured at Cedar Bluff, AL, May 3 by CS General Nathan Bedford Forrest. 
 Reorganized and rejoined army at Nashville, Tennessee, December 1863. 
 Guard duty along Nashville & Chattanooga Railroad, and picketing Tennessee River from Draper's Ferry to Limestone Point. Headquarters at Triana until September 1864. 
  Paint Rock Bridge April 8, 1864. 
  Scout from Triana to Somerville July 29 (detachment). 
 Action at Athens, Alabama, October 1–2. 
 Defense of Decatur October 26–29. 
 Duty at Stevenson, Alabama, until January 1865. 
 At Huntsville, Alabama, and along Mobile & Charleston Railroad until July. 
  Gurley's Tank February 16, 1865 (detachment).

Casualties
The regiment lost a total of 241 men during service; 3 officers and 41 enlisted men killed or mortally wounded, 191 enlisted men died of disease.

Commanders
 Colonel Gilbert Hathaway - killed in action at Blount's Farm, May 2, 1863
 Colonel Alfred B. Wade

Notable members
Lieutenant Colonel Ivan N. Walker - 24th Commander-in-Chief, Grand Army of the Republic, 1895-1896
Job Barnard, First Sergeant in Company K

See also

 List of Indiana Civil War regiments
 Indiana in the Civil War

References
 Baughman, James Keir. The Boys from Lake County: Co. A, 73rd Indiana Volunteer Infantry Regiment (Florida: Baughman Literary Group), 2006. 
 Dyer, Frederick H. A Compendium of the War of the Rebellion (Des Moines, IA: Dyer Pub. Co.), 1908.
 Seventy-Third Indiana Regimental Association. History of the Seventy-Third Indiana Volunteers in the War of 1861-65 (Washington, DC: Carnahan Press), 1909.
Attribution

External links
 Indiana73rd.org: History, rosters, and photo of the regiment's national flag (Archived 2009-10-22)

Military units and formations established in 1862
Military units and formations disestablished in 1865
Units and formations of the Union Army from Indiana
The Lightning Mule Brigade
1862 establishments in Indiana